The Duke Ellington Bridge, named after American jazz pianist Duke Ellington, carries Calvert Street NW over Rock Creek in Washington, D.C., United States.  It connects 18th Street NW in Adams Morgan with Connecticut Avenue NW in Woodley Park, just north of the Taft Bridge.

History

Originally called the "Calvert Street Bridge", it was designed by Paul Philippe Cret in a neoclassical style and built in 1935. 
It was rededicated as the Duke Ellington Bridge following the death of the Washington native and famous band leader in 1974. It is a limestone structure with three graceful  arches. There are four sculptural reliefs on the abutments measuring three feet high by four feet wide. The classical reliefs by Leon Hermant represent the four modes of travel: automobile, train, ship, and plane.

The bridge replaced one built in 1891 by the Rock Creek Railway to carry streetcars.

See also
List of bridges documented by the Historic American Engineering Record in Washington, D.C.

References

External links

Duke Ellington Bridge, from Cultural Tourism DC

Calvert Street Bridge (Duke Ellington Bridge). DDOT Library Collection: DC Bridges and Tunnels, District Department of Transportation (DDOT).

Bridges completed in 1935
Neoclassical architecture in Washington, D.C.
Bridges over Rock Creek (Potomac River tributary)
Duke Ellington
Historic American Engineering Record in Washington, D.C.
Paul Philippe Cret buildings
Road bridges in Washington, D.C.
Adams Morgan
Stone arch bridges in the United States